Thackeray is a surname. Notable people with this surname include the following:

William Makepeace Thackeray
William Makepeace Thackeray (1811−1863), British novelist, author and illustrator

Bal Thackeray and the Thackeray family of India
 Thackeray family 
Aaditya Thackeray (born 1990), Indian politician
Bal Thackeray (1926−2012), Indian politician
Prabodhankar Thackeray, penname of Keshav Sitaram Thackeray (1885–1973), Indian social reformer
Raj Thackeray (born 1968), Indian politician
Rashmi Thackeray, Indian journalist
Uddhav Thackeray (born 1960), Indian politician

Other people with the name
A. David Thackeray (1910–1978), astronomer, after whom Thackeray's Globules in the IC 2944 nebula are named
Andy Thackeray (born 1968), English footballer
Anne Isabella Thackeray Ritchie (1837–1919), English writer, the eldest daughter of William Makepeace Thackeray
Anthony Thackeray (born 1986), English rugby league footballer
David Thackeray (footballer) (born 1902), Scottish footballer
Edward Thackeray (1836–1927), recipient of the Victoria Cross
Francis Thackeray (1793–1842), Church of England clergyman and author
Fred Thackeray (1877–unknown), English footballer
Frederick Thackeray (1816–1892), English cricketer and clergyman
Frederick Rennell Thackeray (1775–1860), senior British Army officer
George Thackeray (1806–1875), English cricketer
Henry St. John Thackeray (1869–1930), British bible scholar
Jim Thackeray (1881–1968), English footballer
John Richard Thackeray (1772-1846), English clergyman 
Lance Thackeray (1869–1916), English illustrator
Merv Thackeray (1925–2014), Australian politician
Michael M. Thackeray (fl. from 1973), South African chemist and battery materials researcher
Peter Thackeray (born 1950),  Kenyan-born English cricketer
Smita Thackeray (fl. from 1997), Indian social activist and film producer
St John Thackeray (1778–1824), a British East India Company collector and political agent
Thomas Thackeray (1693–1760), English clergyman and headmaster

Fictional characters
 Mark Thackeray, a fictional character in the 1967 film To Sir, with Love

See also

 Thackray, a surname
 Thackrey, a surname
 Thackery (disambiguation)

English-language surnames
Surnames of Indian origin